Promalactis albipunctata is a moth of the family Oecophoridae. It is found in Jiangxi province of China and in Korea.

The wingspan is about 11–14 mm.

References

Moths described in 1998
Oecophorinae